Brigadier Samuel Adesujo Ademulegun (20 October 1924 – 15 January 1966) was a Nigerian Army officer, he was Commander of the 1st brigade during the January 1966 coup.

Early life and family
He was born on 20 October 1924 in Ondo Town, Western Nigeria, and was considered one of the country's finest officers at the time. The son of Mr. and Mrs. Michael Ademulegun, he had his early education in Ondo state before joining the Nigerian Army as a private in 1942. Brigadier Samuel Ademulegun was married to Mrs. Latifat Feyisitan Abike Ademulegun (nee Noble) who was also known as Sisi Nurse, he was killed cold-bloodedly during the January 1966 coup. He was survived by his daughter Mrs. Solape Ademulegun-Agbi, Bankole, Kunle, Gbenga, Goke and his oldest son Frank Bamidele who later enlisted into the Nigerian Air Force where he rose to the rank of Group Captain before his death in 2002.

Career life
Ademulegun was commissioned in 1949, and was one of the senior Officer Corps of the army along with Aguiyi Ironsi, Zakariya Maimalari and Babafemi Ogundipe. He was among those vying for the top army post of GOC in 1965 upon the retirement of the expatriate GOC. He was considered friendly with Ahmadu Bello which brought distaste to some junior officers who frowned at their commander fraternizing with politicians.

Death
He and his wife were killed in the 1966 coup when coupists led by Timothy Onwuatuegwu, an instructor at the Nigerian Military Training College barged into his room and was shot dead on his bed. In an eye witness account of the murder of Samuel Ademulegun in an interview by his daughter, Mrs. Solape Ademulegun-Agbi, she narrates how her father was killed by military officers. Her account provides details of the invasion and gruesome murder of the former General Officer Commanding (GOC), 1st Division in Kaduna state. Killed in what is considered Nigeria's first coup, the perpetrators are recorded to believe to be ridding the country of corrupt politicians and those who were close to them.

References

Further reading 

 

1966 deaths
Nigerian military officers
Deaths by firearm in Nigeria
1924 births